Andrei Valeryevich Bryukhanov (born 10 June 1972) is a Russian former football player.

External links
 

1972 births
Sportspeople from Perm, Russia
Living people
Soviet footballers
Russian footballers
Russia under-21 international footballers
FC Baltika Kaliningrad players
FC KAMAZ Naberezhnye Chelny players
Russian Premier League players
FC Zenit Saint Petersburg players
FC Amkar Perm players
Association football defenders
FC Yenisey Krasnoyarsk players
FC Smena Komsomolsk-na-Amure players
FC Sodovik Sterlitamak players
FC Zvezda Perm players
FC Zenit-2 Saint Petersburg players
FC Dynamo Kirov players